Maltby may refer to :

Places
Maltby le Marsh, Lincolnshire, England
Maltby, Lincolnshire, England, near Louth
Maltby, North Yorkshire, England, near Middlesbrough
Maltby, South Yorkshire, England, near Rotherham
Maltby, Washington, USA

Other uses
Maltby (surname)

See also
The Maltby Collection, BBC Radio 4 series